Omphalotropis is a genus of minute salt marsh snails with an operculum, terrestrial gastropod mollusks in the subfamily Omphalotropidinae  of the family Assimineidae.

Species
Species within the genus Omphalotropis include:
 
 Omphalotropis abbreviata (Pease, 1865)
 Omphalotropis acrostoma Solem, 1962
 Omphalotropis albescens  (L. Pfeiffer, 1855)
 Omphalotropis albolabris Möllendorf, 1897
 Omphalotropis andersoni (W. T. Blanford, 1881)
 Omphalotropis angulata Emberton, 2004
 Omphalotropis antelmei Madge, 1946
 Omphalotropis bassinblancensis Griffiths & Florens, 2004
 Omphalotropis betamponae Emberton, 2004
 Omphalotropis bevohimenae Emberton, 2004
 Omphalotropis bifilaris Mousson, 1865
 Omphalotropis biliratus Mousson, 1865
 Omphalotropis boraborensis Dohrn, 1860
 Omphalotropis brazieri Hedley, 1891
 Omphalotropis brevis Godwin-Austen, 1895
 Omphalotropis bulboides I. Rensch, 1937
 Omphalotropis capdambrae Emberton, 2004
 Omphalotropis carolinensis E. A. Smith, 1892 
 Omphalotropis castelli Fischer-Piette, Blanc, C.P., Blanc, F. & Salvat, 1993
 Omphalotropis catenata Möllendorff, 1897
 Omphalotropis ceramensis  (L. Pfeiffer, 1862)
 Omphalotropis cheynei  (Dohrn & C. Semper, 1862)
 Omphalotropis circumlineata  (Mousson, 1870)
 Omphalotropis clavula  (Morelet, 1866)
 Omphalotropis columellaris  Quadras & Möllendorff, 1893
 Omphalotropis conella Sykes, 1903
 Omphalotropis conjugens Möllendorff, 1893
 Omphalotropis conoideus Mousson, 1865 
 Omphalotropis cookei   Abbott, 1949
 Omphalotropis coronata Möllendorff, 1887
 Omphalotropis costata (Pease, 1868)
 Omphalotropis costulata  (Mousson, 1870)
 Omphalotropis coturnix (Crosse, 1867)
 Omphalotropis crassilabris Möllendorff, 1895
 Omphalotropis decussata (W. T. Blanford, 1881)
 Omphalotropis denselirata  Quadras & Möllendorff, 1894
 Omphalotropis desjardinsi Madge, 1939
 Omphalotropis distermina W. H. Benson, 1863
 Omphalotropis dubia (L. Pfeiffer, 1846)
 Omphalotropis ducalis Möllendorff, 1897
 Omphalotropis dupontiana G. Nevill, 1878
 Omphalotropis elegans  Quadras & Möllendorff, 1894
 Omphalotropis elongatula  Quadras & Möllendorff, 1894
 Omphalotropis erosa (Quoy & Gaimard, 1832)
 Omphalotropis expansilabris (L. Pfeiffer, 1854)
 Omphalotropis fortis Emberton, 2004
 Omphalotropis fragilis (Pease, 1861)
 Omphalotropis galokoae Emberton, 2004
 Omphalotropis globosa (Benson in L. Pfeiffer, 1854)
 Omphalotropis gracilis  Quadras & Möllendorff, 1894
 Omphalotropis grandis Thiele, 1928
 Omphalotropis granum  (L. Pfeiffer, 1855)
 Omphalotropis griffithsi Emberton, 2004
 Omphalotropis guamensis  (L. Pfeiffer, 1857)
 Omphalotropis hercules Ponsonby & Sykes, 1899
 Omphalotropis hieroglyphica (Potiez & Michaud, 1838)
 Omphalotropis howeinsulae Iredale, 1944
 Omphalotropis huaheinensis  (L. Pfeiffer, 1855)
 Omphalotropis ilapiryensis Pearce & Paustian, 2013
 Omphalotropis ingens  (Mousson, 1870)
 Omphalotropis laticosta  Quadras & Möllendorff, 1894
 Omphalotropis latilabris  Quadras & Möllendorff, 1894
 Omphalotropis lemniscatus van Benthem Jutting, 1963
 Omphalotropis littorinula Crosse, 1873
 Omphalotropis longula (Mousson, 1870)
 Omphalotropis madagascariensis Germain, 1921
 Omphalotropis major  (Morelet, 1866)
 Omphalotropis manomboae Emberton, 2004
 Omphalotropis mapianus Bavay, 1908
 Omphalotropis margarita (L. Pfeiffer, 1851)
 Omphalotropis maxima Madge, 1939
 Omphalotropis moebii E. von Martens, 1880
 Omphalotropis moussoni (Garrett, 1884)
 † Omphalotropis multilirata (L. Pfeiffer, 1854) 
 Omphalotropis mutica Möllendorff, 1897
 Omphalotropis nebulosa Pease, 1872
 Omphalotropis oblonga  (L. Pfeiffer, 1855)
 Omphalotropis ochthogyra   Quadras & Möllendorff, 1894
 Omphalotropis pallida (W. T. Blanford, 1881)
 Omphalotropis papuensis E. A. Smith, 1896
 Omphalotropis picta Quadras & Möllendorf, 1894
 Omphalotropis picturata H. Adams, 1867
 Omphalotropis pilosa  Quadras & Möllendorff, 1894
 Omphalotropis plicosa (L. Pfeiffer, 1854)
 Omphalotropis producta (Pease, 1865)
 Omphalotropis protracta Hedley, 1891
 Omphalotropis pulchella Thiele, 1928
 Omphalotropis pupoides (Anton, 1838)
 Omphalotropis quadrasi Möllendorff, 1894
 Omphalotropis quirosi Clench, 1958
 Omphalotropis quittorensis Griffiths & Florens, 2004
 Omphalotropis radiatus  (L. Pfeiffer, 1855)
 Omphalotropis rangii (Férussac, 1827)
 Omphalotropis ripae Fischer-Piette, Blanc, F. & Salvat, 1969
 Omphalotropis rosea (A. Gould, 1847)
 Omphalotropis rubens (Quoy & Gaimard, 1832)
 Omphalotropis rubra (Gassies, 1874)
 Omphalotropis scitula (A. Gould, 1847)
 Omphalotropis semperi Möllendorff, 1893
 Omphalotropis setocincta Ancey, 1890
 Omphalotropis sordida (Frauenfeld, 1863)
 Omphalotropis stevanovitchi Griffiths, 2000
 Omphalotropis striatapila Möllendorff, 1897
 Omphalotropis submaritima  Quadras & Möllendorff, 1894
 Omphalotropis subsoluta  (Mousson, 1870)
 Omphalotropis suturalis  Quadras & Möllendorff, 1894
 Omphalotropis taeniata Crosse, 1873
 Omphalotropis tahitensis (Pease, 1861)
 Omphalotropis tantelia Emberton, 2004
 Omphalotropis terebralis (A. Gould, 1847)
 Omphalotropis tumidula Möllendorff, 1897
 Omphalotropis vacoasensis Griffiths & Florens, 2004
 Omphalotropis vallata (A. Gould, 1847)
 Omphalotropis variabilis (Pease, 1865)
 Omphalotropis varians Möllendorff, 1897
 Omphalotropis variegata  (Morelet, 1866)
 Omphalotropis viridescens (Pease, 1861)
 Omphalotropis vohimenae Emberton & Pearce, 1999

Taxon inquirendum
 Omphalotropis fischeriana (Gassies, 1863)

Synonyms
 Omphalotropis albocarinata Mousson, 1873: synonym of Duritropis albocarinata (Mousson, 1873) (original combination)
 Omphalotropis costulata Emberton & Pearce, 1999: synonym of Omphalotropis ilapiryensis Pearce & Paustian, 2013 (junior secondary homonym of Omphalotropis costulata  (Mousson, 1870))
 Omphalotropis laevigata   Quadras & Möllendorff, 1894: synonym of Chalicopoma laevigatum  Quadras & Möllendorff, 1894) (original name)
 Omphalotropis semicostulata  Quadras & Möllendorff, 1894: synonym of Chalicopoma semicostulatum (Quadras & Möllendorff, 1894)) (original combination)
 Omphalotropis suteri Sykes, 1900: synonym of Telmosena suteri (Sykes, 1900) (original combination)

References 

 Thiele, J. (1927). Über die Schneckenfamilie Assimineidae. Zoologische Jahrbücher. Abteilung für Systematik, Geographie und Biologie der Tiere. 53: 113–146.

External links
 Pfeiffer, L. (1851-1852). Conspectus Cyclostomaceorum. Zeitschrift für Malakozoologie. 8(10): 145–160
 Möllendorff, O. F. von. (1898). [Besprechung von Godwin-Austen.] Land and freshwater Mollusca of India. Nachrichtsblatt der deutschen malakozoologischen Gesellschaft. 30(7/8): 97-104.
 Kobelt, W. & Möllendorff, O. von. (1898). Catalog der gegenwärtig lebend bekannten Pneumonopomen. Nachrichtsblatt der Deutschen Malakozoologischen Gesellschaft. 30: 129-160
 Pease, W.H. (1868). Descriptions of new * Of land snails inhabiting Polynesia. American Journal of Conchology. 3(3): 223-230, pl. 15

 
Assimineidae
Taxonomy articles created by Polbot
Gastropod genera
Taxa named by Ludwig Karl Georg Pfeiffer